This is a list of All Elite Wrestling (AEW) special events, which primarily includes television specials, such as special episodes of the promotion's flagship weekly television programs, Wednesday Night Dynamite and Friday Night Rampage. Beginning in mid-March 2020, AEW's events were held at Daily's Place in Jacksonville, Florida due to the COVID-19 pandemic until the promotion resumed live touring in July 2021.

Specials

2019

Notes
Fyter Fest and Fight for the Fallen were special events that aired for free on the B/R Live streaming service in the United States. Internationally, the events were available via pay-per-view.

2020

2021

2022

2023

Upcoming special events

2023

See also
List of All Elite Wrestling pay-per-view events

References 

All Elite Wrestling
All Elite Wrestling lists
2019 in professional wrestling
2020 in professional wrestling
2021 in professional wrestling
2022 in professional wrestling